The men's 100 metres T36 took place in Stadium Australia.

There were two heats and one final round. The T36 is for athletes who have cerebral palsy or other coordination impairments.

Heats

Heat 1

Heat 2

Final round

References

Athletics at the 2000 Summer Paralympics